The 1920 South Dakota gubernatorial election was held on November 2, 1920.  Incumbent Republican Governor Peter Norbeck declined to run for re-election, instead choosing to run for the U.S. Senate. Lieutenant Governor William H. McMaster won the Republican primary and advanced to the general election, where he faced Nonpartisan League candidate Mark P. Bates and former State Senator William W. Howes, the Democratic nominee. The election was largely a replay of the 1918 election, with McMaster winning a large victory, Bates coming in second, and Howes coming in a distant third.

Primary elections

Democratic Primary
Former State Senator William W. Howes, who previously represented Beadle County in the State Senate, won the Democratic nomination unopposed and the race did not appear on the primary election ballot.

Republican Primary

Candidates
 William H. McMaster, Lieutenant Governor
 Richard O. Richards, perennial candidate

Results

General election

Results

References

South Dakota
1920
Gubernatorial
November 1920 events in the United States